Secretariat Building may refer to:

 Secretariat Building, Chandigarh in India
 Secretariat Building, New Delhi in India
 Secretariat Building, Bandar Seri Begawan in Brunei
 The United Nations Secretariat Building in Manhattan
 Former name of General Treasury Building, Sri Lanka
 Former name of Ministers' Building, Burma
 Kerala Government Secretariat, the secretariat building of the State Government of Kerala
 Malacca State Secretariat Building
 Mantralaya, Mumbai the secretariat building of the State Government of Maharashtra
 Namakkal Kavignar Maligai the secretariat building of the State Government of Tamil Nadu 
 Negeri Sembilan State Secretariat Building
 Patna Secretariat the secretariat building of the State Government of Bihar
 Perlis State Secretariat Building
 Sultan Ibrahim Building, former state secretariat building of Johor
 Writers' Building, the secretariat building of the State Government of West Bengal